Emma Green may refer to:

 Emma Green (athlete) (born 1984), Swedish high jumper
 Emma Green (journalist), American journalist
 Emma Green (nurse), American Civil War nurse
 Emma Edwards Green (1856–1942), designer of the Great Seal of Idaho
 Emma Geller Green, character from Friends TV show, see List of Friends characters

See also
 Emma (disambiguation)
 Green (disambiguation)